Tomlinson may refer to:

People
Tomlinson (given name)
Tomlinson (surname)

Others
Tomlinson, Illinois, U.S. unincorporated community 
Tomlinson Electric Vehicles, defunct British motor vehicle manufacturer
Tomlinson Stadium–Kell Field, baseball stadium in Jonesboro, Arkansas, U.S.

See also